916 America is a minor planet orbiting the Sun in the main belt between Mars and Jupiter.

It was discovered on 7 August 1915 by the Russian astronomer Grigory Nikolaevich Neujmin at Simeis, Russian Empire. Originally designated 916ΣI, it was renamed '916 America' on 24 February 1923 after the Council of Astronomers at Pulkovo Observatory decided to commemorate "the friendly relations of the astronomical observatories and astronomers". Another possible reason for the name was as a mark of appreciation for the help given during the 1921 Russian famine by the American Relief Administration under the later President Herbert Hoover.

In 1986, assuming that the asteroid was of S-type and that it had a diameter of 15 km, the rotational period was measured to be 38 hours. Observations by the Infrared Astronomical Satellite have since shown that it has a diameter of 33.2±1.3 km, with an absolute magnitude of 11.20 and an albedo of 0.053±0.004.

References

External links 
 
 

000916
Discoveries by Grigory Neujmin
Named minor planets
19150807